Tanner Joe Meyer (born May 10, 1962) is an American former Major League Baseball player.

Drafted by the Brewers in the 5th round of the 1983 Major League Baseball draft, Meyer showed prodigious power in the minor leagues. Meyer holds the record for the longest home run in professional baseball history at 582 feet, which he hit June 3, 1987 at Denver's Mile High Stadium. There have been longer home runs reportedly hit but not measured by accurate methods.

Meyer made his major league debut with the Brewers on April 4, . His power numbers did not translate into major league home runs, as he hit just 11 in 103 games for Milwaukee. He did, however, strike out 88 times, compiling more strikeouts than hits. He did have one significant accomplishment on August 9, when he became the first and only player to hit a walk-off home run off Roger Clemens.

Meyer wound up splitting that season between the Brewers and Denver. His final major league game was on September 30, 1989, and he was released after the season. He returned to the United States, and was signed to a minor league contract by the Minnesota Twins. During spring training, he was traded to the Pittsburgh Pirates, and spent the entire season with their Triple-A affiliate, the Buffalo Bisons. That was his last year in professional baseball.

As of 2021, Meyer works in the security department of a hospital in Maui. He told MLB.com "I don't tell anybody" about his time in professional baseball.

References

External links

Major League Baseball first basemen
Milwaukee Brewers players
Baseball players from Hawaii
Hawaii Rainbow Warriors baseball players
American expatriate baseball players in Japan
Yokohama Taiyō Whales players
Punahou School alumni
Buffalo Bisons (minor league) players
1962 births
Living people
Beloit Brewers players
Denver Zephyrs players
El Paso Diablos players
Vancouver Canadians players
American expatriate baseball players in Canada